The Lanchester Ten and Lanchester Eleven were sold by The Lanchester Motor Company Limited from the Ten's announcement in September 1932 until 1951. Quite different from previous Lanchesters, the Ten was the second (it followed the Lanchester 15/18) of Lanchester's new owner's new Daimler-linked Lanchester range. The names Ten and Eleven referred to the engine's rating for the annual tax and did not relate to the engine's power output.

Part of the thinking behind BSA's acquisition of Lanchester was, in consideration of the international economic depression, to extend the BSA group's range of cars into the sectors between those filled by Daimler and the three-wheeled 'cars' of BSA Cars without affecting Daimler's super-luxury image.

Ultimately the smallest Lanchester became far too expensive for the size of car it was, few were sold and production ended in 1951.

Lanchester Ten
The Lanchester Ten announced in September 1932 shared its basic chassis with the BSA Ten which would be announced the following month. The design of its four-cylinder engine it shared with the six-cylinder Lanchester 15/18 (Daimler Light Twenty 16/20), which had been in production for twelve months, and its engine represented just four-sixths of the 1805 cc Daimler Fifteen announced with this Ten. The smallest Lanchester ever produced it was also the one produced in the greatest numbers, with approximately 12,250 sold.

Design and specifications
Additional details to those in the tables

Engine
Its crankshaft was provided with three main bearings.
A 1287 cc, 40 b.h.p. (at 4,000 r.p.m.) version was produced, with a 7.4:1 compression ratio, and 60 lbs. ft. maximum torque at 2,000 r.p.m. 

The overhead valves had single springs but there were return springs to keep the rockers to the pushrods. Engine accessories were mounted: distributor on a level with the cylinder head, the coil just in front. The petrol pump, oil filter and oil diprod were mounted aft of the distributor.

Engine timing was by chain. The flywheel and gearbox formed a single unit with the engine which was slightly inclined and held to the chassis at four points on rubber.

Transmission
This was the first small car to have the Daimler fluid flywheel transmission.

The preselection finger and thumb lever was just under the steering wheel on the near side and so worked by the left hand. There was a stop for reverse.

Power was delivered to the wheels by Daimler fluid flywheel and Wilson four-speed preselective self-changing gearbox through a propeller shaft which was open and had mechanical joints. The back axle had half-floating underslung worm drive.

Chassis
The frame had the popular cruciform or X-channelled sectioned cross-membering. The unit of engine, fluid flywheel and self-changing gearbox was held at four points on rubber, the two points in front being close together and on the cross member.

Half-elliptical springs wide-set to prevent roll were fitted with hydraulic shock-absorbers. In front they were shackled forwards, flat, sloped, and splayed—there were no dumb irons, while at the back the springs and frame were also under the axle.

Steering was by cam and lever. The four-wheel brakes were initially Lockheed hydraulic. The handbrake lever, designed for use as a parking brake, operated on the back wheels using cables. "The lower gears can be used as an emergency brake". Tyres were 4.5 x 19 inches 

Revisions to the specification before the October 1934 Motor Show:
 The preselector lever was now mounted on the offside under the steering wheel by the driver's right hand.
 A pull-up handbrake was positioned on the offside of the driver's seat and the cushion shaped to fit.
 Larger 4.75 section tyres were fitted on smaller 18 inch wheels
 The brakes were switched from hydraulic to mechanical operation.
 Transmission problems were tackled by adding a further mounting-point (making five) for the whole engine and transmission assembly at the back of the gearbox where it was supported by an extra chassis cross-member.  The transmission made a significant humming noise while in neutral and there were difficulties with excessive vibration from oil surge in the fluid flywheel when picking up under heavy load at low speed. The transmission mechanism for top-gear was modified to reduce pedal pressure and ensure positive engagement and disengagement while avoiding a humming sound in neutral.

Saloon six-light four-door body
"This body provides full room for four persons with a level floor. There are two cupboards, four pockets, a sliding roof, safety glass and other usual fittings but no ash trays. There are louvres over the four door glasses. The windscreen opens. The spare wheel is behind the folding luggage grid at the back. The generous wheelbase and the absence of a gearlever in the floor gives excellent entrance and exit through all four doorways." motoring correspondent The Times

Performance
The motoring correspondent of The Times also reported "the saloon will keep up 50 easily, even under load, and will do about 60 on the level." The Ten h.p. Lanchester 6-light saloon is a car de luxe by its transmission which gives the greatest smoothness and simplicity, rapid acceleration, and additional safety, and also by its design, general finish, and quietness in running.

Pricing
 chassis £240
 standard saloon £315 with sliding roof and green leather upholstery six-light body
 sports saloon £345 four-light body—introduced September 1933
 fixed head coupé £335
 sports open car £350 by Martin Walter

Engine upgrade for 1936
A twenty percent increase of engine capacity from 1203 cc to 1444 cc was announced on 14 August 1935. Although the engine's Tax rating was now 10.8 hp the new reduction in the rate of tax meant the annual tax charge was less. The engine fluid flywheel and gearbox assembly has a five-point bi-axial rubber mounting.

All models were now fitted with new tubular front seats giving back seat passengers extra toe-room. The popularity of the cars enabled appreciable price reductions.

Steering which was by cam and lever now by worm and nut. The propellor shaft is now provided with needle-roller bearings. There is a stabilising front bumper. Four-wheel brakes are now mechanical by Girling. Maximum speed was reported as having moved up to 65 mph.

Road test
The Times reported the larger engine did not run as sweetly as its predecessor but that it had appreciably more liveliness and speed. There was still a slight hum with the engine running and the transmission in neutral but if anyone minded that the car can be held stationary with a gear engaged.

Lanchester Eleven facelift for 1937

New-shaped six-light saloon and four-light sports saloon bodies were quietly announced in the third week of September 1936 and the model was named Eleven instead of Ten. The bodies were larger and heavier than before. The news of their availability seems to have been deliberately swamped by the prior announcement of the replacement for Lanchester's Twelve-six, the Fourteen saloon and sports saloon, both were variants of the Daimler Fifteen cars. The new Eleven grille is shown in the bottom left corner of the large display advertisement of the new Fourteens and very little of the rest of the car can be seen.

The new Lanchester Elevens were smaller but almost identical in appearance  to the slightly larger Lanchester and Daimler cars.

The engine coolant now had a pump and thermostatically controlled bypass.

Pricing
Motor Show October 1936:
 chassis £240
 standard saloon £330 six-light body
 2/4 seater fixed head coupé £330 

Motor Show October 1937:
reduced prices made possible by "the increased popularity and larger sales" of the Eleven
 Saloon fabric topped £275
 Saloon panelled £285 six-light
 Sports saloon four-door four-light £290
The panelled saloon and the sports saloon have new features such as wider doors and a central folding armrest and the weight of the standard saloon is now .

Motor Show October 1938:
two body styles available
 Standard saloon 441 with six side windows £295
 Sports saloon 442 with four side windows £298

LD10

The Lanchester Ten, also known as the LD10, produced after the Second World War was presented as a compact companion model to the Daimler range, being "craftsman built" and among the smallest ever volume-produced cars from the firm. It was initially produced with a steel six-light body by Briggs Motor Bodies of Dagenham though this body suffered from erratic deliveries by Briggs and rust problems due to the grade of steel allocated by the government for their manufacture. From September 1949 the same chassis was instead fitted with coachbuilt Barker aluminium alloy sports saloon bodywork. Other body variations included an Abbott-bodied drophead coupe and Hooper-bodied van.

This was coupled through a fluid flywheel to an epicyclic preselector 4-speed gear box. Stopping power came from Girling mechanical brakes.

The car was considered to be exceptionally smooth in operation, with reasonable performance for its time.

References

External links

 1939 Lanchester Eleven front
 Lanchester Eleven side
 Lanchester Eleven rear

10
Cars introduced in 1932
1930s cars
1940s cars
1950s cars